Global Engineering Education is a field of study that focuses on the impact of globalization on the engineering industry.

History 
Over the past decade or so educators and researchers have made an effort to transform engineering education in light of global trends in the profession.  In 1985, the National Research Council issued a study that spotlighted the need for universities to graduate engineers with professional skills. This message was reinforced through a 1994 joint report published by the Engineering Deans Council and ASEE that stated, “Today, engineering colleges … must educate their students to work as part of teams, communicate well, and understand the economic, social, environmental and international context of their professional activities.”

Definitions

Global Competency
Global competency is essential for engineers from any country who now compete in an international market for engineering know-how.  No longer is cultural sensitivity needed only for product design destined for diverse markets. Increasingly, successful entry into the engineering profession requires significant intercultural skills in order to join efficient and productive collaborations with diverse engineering colleagues. Those colleagues may be encountered “virtually” at a distance, in person at an international site, or next door in the office of a multinational corporation. Outsourcing is increasing, not only for products but also for processes, including highly technical engineering work. Projects are distributed across sites and effective collaboration requires professionals who can work productively with colleagues who are very different from themselves.

Organizations 
These are some organizations around the world that focus on global engineering education
Purdue University, USA
International Engineering Program at the University of Rhode Island
RMIT University, Australia
Centre for Engineering Education, Universiti Teknologi Malaysia, Malaysia
Shanghai Jiao Tong University, China
Universität Karlsruhe, Germany
Worcester Polytechnic Institute, USA
Virginia Polytechnic Institute and State University, USA
University of Texas at Austin, Cockrell School of Engineering, USA
University of Wisconsin Madison, College of Engineering, USA
University of British Columbia, Canada
Spanish University of Distance Education - UNED, Electrical and Computer Engineering Department - DIEEC, Spain
Deccan Herald
Pforzheim University, Germany
Kogakuin University, Tokyo, Japan
Tokyo Global Engineering Corporation, Tokyo, Japan
Ben-Gurion University of the Negev, Israel
 Texas A&M University, USA

See also 
Global Education Network Europe

References

Engineering education